Simple Rules: How to Thrive in a Complex World is a 2015 business strategy book co-authored by Donald N. Sull, a senior lecturer at the MIT Sloan School of Management, and Kathleen M. Eisenhardt, a professor at the Stanford University School of Engineering.

Content
Sull and Eisenhardt suggest that a limited set of simple rules must be applied to solve specific problems in complex situations. This thesis, which emphasizes "short cut strategies", is the best way for businesses to solve problems. The book illustrates this with many case studies, ranging "from medical care to college football to complexity theory."

Critical reception

A review in the Sydney Morning Herald suggested the book was "neither a silver bullet nor a self-help book." However, the review welcomed the vulgarization of their business ideas.

References

External links
Simple Rules : How to Thrive in a Complex World at Houghton Mifflin McCourt.
Donald Sull: "Simple Rules - How to Thrive in a Complex World" | Talks at Google on YouTube
Kathleen Eisenhardt:: "Simple Rules: How to Thrive in a Complex World" | Talks at Google on YouTube

2015 non-fiction books
Management books
Houghton Mifflin books